William Edward John McCarthy, Baron McCarthy (30 July 1925 – 18 November 2012) was a British  Labour politician. McCarthy was a fellow of Nuffield College and Templeton College, Oxford and a specialist in industrial relations. He was created a life peer on 19 January 1976 as Baron McCarthy, of Headington in the City of Oxford. From 1979 to 1997 he was Opposition Spokesperson for Employment. McCarthy was described as "one of Britain’s most influential academics in the field of industrial relations, a painstaking arbiter in the most testing of disputes.. "

McCarthy grew up in Islington, London and attended Holloway County School (now Holloway School). He worked in a gentlemen's outfitter, where he was a representative of the USDAW trade union, which sponsored him to study for a diploma at Ruskin College, Oxford. In 1955 he matriculated at Merton College, Oxford, taking a first class honours degree in philosophy, politics and economics (PPE) in 1957 before going on to read for a DPhil at Nuffield College, Oxford, where he held a research fellowship from 1959 to 1963.

In 1965 he was appointed research director of the Royal Commission on Trade Unions and Employers’ Associations. The body was set up by the Harold Wilson government and led to the failed "In Place of Strife" reforms proposed by Barbara Castle. In the following three years McCarthy carried out extensive research, particularly into the election of shop stewards.

In 1978 McCarthy was involved in the arbitration in the dispute over bonuses for drivers of the high-speed Advanced Passenger Train. ASLEF, the train-drivers’ union insisted that the bonus be paid to all its members and went on strike in protest. McCarthy ruled that only those driving at more than 100 mph should receive the bonus, but it took the union a year to accept the ruling.

McCarthy was a distinguished supporter of the British Humanist Association.

Selected works
 The Closed Shop in Britain (1964)
 The Role of Shop Stewards in British Industrial Relations (1966)
 Trade Unions (1972, 1985)
 Coming to Terms with Trade Unions (1973)
 Strikes in Post-War Britain (1983)
 Fairness at Work (1999)

References

1925 births
2012 deaths
People educated at Holloway School
Fellows of Nuffield College, Oxford
Labour Party (UK) life peers
Alumni of Merton College, Oxford
Alumni of Nuffield College, Oxford
Life peers created by Elizabeth II